The Boy and the Dove is a 1961 Soviet short film directed by Andrey Konchalovsky.

Plot 
The film tells about a boy who dreams of acquiring a dove and depicting him on a wall. He can endlessly watch the birds flying in the sky. But the dove can't afford it. The guy decides to buy a dove for an album with stamps and sends a pigeon to the sky. But the dove returned to his former owner...

Cast 
 Nikolay Burlyaev

References

External links 
 

1961 films
1960s Russian-language films
Soviet short films